On January 15, 1987, at 12:52 local time, SkyWest Airlines Flight 1834 a Swearingen SA-226TC (METRO II), and a Mooney M20 were involved in a midair collision near Kearns, Utah. The two pilots and six passengers aboard the METRO II and the two pilots aboard the Mooney were killed. NTSB investigators primarily blamed the small plane pilots for wandering into restricted airspace, but a judge later assigned 51% responsibility to FAA air traffic controllers.

Collision 
The SkyWest Airlines aircraft, which was 30 minutes late, was on final approach to Runway 34 of Salt Lake City International Airport. The Mooney M20 took off from South Valley Regional Airport, piloted by a flight instructor and his student. 

The air traffic controller watching the area failed to recognize the danger when the Mooney pilots wandered into restricted airspace. The controller did not notice the small plane on the radar and directed the SkyWest pilots to turn. Making that turn, the SkyWest plane collided with the Mooney.

Residents below the collision reported a "big boom," and then, "parts were flying everywhere". The main section of the SkyWest aircraft slid through a chain-link fence, stopping in the middle of a suburban street. Wreckage scattered over a one-mile-square area, with body parts hanging from trees. Authorities had to open a temporary morgue at a nearby church as they recovered the victims.

Investigation 
The NTSB investigation ultimately blamed the Mooney M20 instructor pilot for straying into the Salt Lake City airport radar service area. The investigation also criticised the lack of a Mode-C transponder and the limitations of air traffic control collision protection.

A Federal judge, however, later ruled FAA air traffic controllers were 51% responsible for the crash and the Mooney pilots were 49% at fault.

See also 

Aeroméxico Flight 498 another collision between a private aircraft and a commercial airliner.
PSA Flight 182
N600XL
2002 Überlingen mid-air collision - another collision involving an air controller

References 

Airliner accidents and incidents caused by pilot error
Accidents and incidents involving the Fairchild Swearingen Metroliner
Mid-air collisions
Mid-air collisions involving airliners
Mid-air collisions involving general aviation aircraft
Aviation accidents and incidents in the United States in 1987
1987 in Utah
January 1987 events in the United States